La Vineuse sur Fregande is a commune in the department of Saône-et-Loire, eastern France. The municipality was established on 1 January 2017 by merger of the former communes of La Vineuse (the seat), Donzy-le-National, Massy and Vitry-lès-Cluny.

See also 
Communes of the Saône-et-Loire department

References 

Vineusesurfregande